Eduard Clemens Fechner (21 August 1799 – 7 February 1861) was a German portrait painter and an etcher.

Fechner was born at Gross Särchen, near Bad Muskau, and studied in 1814 at Dresden under Grassi and Retsch. In 1820 he went to Munich, where he improved his style under Stieler. He worked some time for the Duke of Leuchtenberg, and visited Paris in 1826. He excelled in painting portraits of ladies and children; he also executed eleven etchings in a spirited manner. He died in Paris, aged 61.

Fechner was the brother of experimental psychology pioneer and founder of psychophysics Gustav Fechner and of Clementine Wieck Fechner, who was the stepmother of Clara Schumann née Wieck, the famous pianist and composer, when Clementine became her father Friedrich Wieck's second wife.

See also
 List of German painters

Notes

References
 

1799 births
1861 deaths
19th-century German painters
German male painters
German portrait painters
People from Żary County
Artists from Saxony
19th-century German male artists